Glyptemys is a genus of turtles in the family Emydidae.  It comprises two species, the bog turtle and wood turtle, both of which are endemic to North America. Until 2001, these turtles were considered members of the genus Clemmys, which currently has one member, the spotted turtle.

These turtles are semiaquatic, although this varies based on season. Their morphological characteristics make them unique from other species and unique from each other.

Glyptemys turtles prefer slow moving streams and ponds, and feed on insects, plant matter, small invertebrates, and  carrion.  These turtles are protected throughout their range. All species in Glyptemys are considered endangered.

Taxonomy

The taxonomic classification of Emydidae turtles has been eventful and many schools of thought are given about how the different genera and species should be arranged.

Before 2001, the bog and wood turtles were members of the genus Clemmys, but they were moved to a newly created genus, Glyptemys, after further morphological and genetic analyses revealed they were much closer relatives to each other than to the spotted turtle. The bog turtle and wood turtle have similar genetic makeups that are marginally different from that of the spotted turtle, the only current member of the genus Clemmys. The western pond turtle was also a former member of Clemmys, but it was recently moved to the genus Actinemys, of which it is now the only member.  Both Glyptemys turtles have karyotypes of 50 chromosomes.

The several common names for the bog include mud turtle, marsh turtle, yellowhead, and snapper while the wood may be referred to as the sculptured tortoise, red-legged tortoise, or redleg.

Description

Glyptemys turtles are small to medium in size: the bog turtle males grow to be  and females  while wood turtles of either gender reach  in length. Bog turtles weigh  and wood turtles average  at maturity. The bog can be recognized by small, bright blotches on each side of its neck  and the wood by its dark gray to black head and bright orange coloration on its ventral surfaces.

The wood turtle exhibits genetic sex determination, in contrast to the temperature-dependent sex determination of most turtles; the method of sex determination for the bog turtle is unknown.

Distribution and habitat

Glyptemys turtles are endemic to eastern North America.  Their collective range extends from Nova Scotia south to Georgia and from Nova Scotia west to Minnesota. These turtles are semiaquatic and are commonly found in bogs, fens, and small streams which have soft yet compacted, sandy bottoms.

Evolutionary history
During the last post-Pleistocene ice age, Glyptemys turtles were forced south by encroaching glaciers from the north.  After glaciation, some turtle colonies relocated to their original northern range, while others continued to live in the new, southern range.  Some fossil remains from the Rancholabrean period (300,000 to 11,000 years BP) have been found in Georgia and Tennessee, areas farther south than the turtles' current range.

Ecology and behavior
These turtles are diurnal and become active in the early morning. During extremely cold days, they each may spend time under water, while the bog has been known to also seek dense underbrush or mud in which to bury itself.
Excessively hot days sometimes causes these turtles to estivate.

Conservation
Both species are protected throughout their ranges.  The bog turtle is considered critically endangered by the IUCN, while the wood turtle is labeled as endangered, a less dire rating.

For more information on species conservation, see the individual species pages of the bog turtle and the wood turtle.

References
Notes

Footnotes

Bibliography

Further reading
 

 
Reptiles of North America
Reptiles of the United States
Turtle genera
Taxa named by Louis Agassiz